Santa Ana is a corregimiento within Panama City, in Panamá District, Panamá Province, Panama with a population of 18,210 as of 2010. Its population as of 1990 was 27,657; its population as of 2000 was 21,098.

References

Corregimientos of Panamá Province
Panamá District